For soccer in Canada, the quadrennial Canada Summer Games competition has an association football tournament. The participants are the provincial soccer associations.

Participants

 British Columbia Soccer Association
 Alberta Soccer Association
 Saskatchewan Soccer Association
 Manitoba Soccer Association
 Ontario Soccer Association
 Quebec Soccer Federation
 Newfoundland and Labrador Soccer Association
 Soccer Nova Scotia
 Soccer New Brunswick
 Prince Edward Island Soccer Association
 Yukon Soccer Association

Statistics

Participating provinces

Men

Medal winners

Men

Medal table

Men

Notable players
Twenty-one players from the Canada Games soccer tournament have since been inducted in the Canada Soccer Hall of Fame as honoured players from their professional and international careers (through the Class of 2022).

 Garry Ayre ( 1973 gold)
 Patrice Bernier ( 1997 gold)
 Bob Bolitho ( 1973 gold)
 Jack Brand ( 1973 silver)
 Ian Bridge ( 1977 gold)
 Carla Chin ( 1993)
 Tony Chursky ( 1973 gold)
 Janine Helland ( 1993)
 Randee Hermus ( 1997 gold)
 Lyndon Hooper ( 1985 bronze)
 Kara Lang ( 2001 gold)
 Karina LeBlanc ( 1997 gold)
 Sam Lenarduzzi ( 1969 gold)
 John McGrane ( 1973 silver)
 Kevin McKenna ( 1997 bronze)
 Luce Mongrain ( 1993 bronze)
 Suzanne Muir ( 1993 silver)
 Andrea Neil ( 1993 gold)
 Helen Stoumbos ( 1993)
 Mark Watson ( 1989)
 Rhian Wilkinson ( 2001)

Other notable athletes that played soccer at the Canada Games include:

 Chris Bennett ( 1973 gold)
 Melanie Booth ( 2001 gold)
 Allysha Chapman ( 2005 bronze)
 Drew Ferguson ( 1977 gold)
 Robyn Gayle ( 2001 gold)
 Vanessa Gilles ( 2013 bronze)
 Julia Grosso ( 2017)
 Doneil Henry ( 2009 bronze)
 Kaylyn Kyle ( 2005)
 Adriana Leon ( 2009 bronze)
 Sydney Leroux ( 2005 gold)
 Diana Matheson ( 2001 gold)
 Erin McLeod ( 2001)
 Kamal Miller ( 2013 bronze)
 Carmelina Moscato ( 2001 gold)
 Marie-Eve Nault ( 2001)
 Kelly Parker ( 2001 bronze)
 Lui Passaglia ( 1973 gold)
 Desiree Scott ( 005)
 Dayne St. Clair ( 2013 bronze)
 Katie Weatherston ( 2001 gold)
 Shelina Zadorsky ( 2009 bronze)

External links
Soccer at the Canada Games

Canada Games
Canada Games soccer